Jankowice Wielkie  is a village in the administrative district of Gmina Olszanka, within Brzeg County, Opole Voivodeship, in south-western Poland. 

Jankowicz was first mentioned in a 1352 deed, when it belonged to the Piast Duchy of Brzeg. 
The village has a population of 750.

References

Jankowice Wielkie